Miss Universe 1964, the 13th Miss Universe pageant, was held on 1 August 1964 at the Miami Beach Convention Hall in Miami Beach, Florida, United States. Corinna Tsopei of Greece was crowned by the outgoing titleholder, Iêda Maria Vargas of Brazil, making her the first and so far only Miss Universe from Greece.

Results

Placements

Contestants

  - María Amalia Ramírez
  - Lidia Lidwina Henriquez
  - Ria Lubyen
  - Gloria Mackh
  - Catherine Cartwright
  - Danièle Defrere
  - Olga Mónica del Carpio Oropeza
  - Ângela Vasconcelos
  - Mary Rande Holl
  - Mary Lou Farrell 
  - Annette Dona Kulatunga
  - Patricia Herrera Cigna
  - Alba Ramírez Plaza
  - Dora Marcela Sola
  - Iris Anette de Windt
  - Yvonne Mortensen
  - Clara Chapuseaux Soñé
  - Tanya Yela Klein Loffredo
  - Brenda Blackler
  - Sirpa Wallenius
  - Edith Noël
  - Marina Kettler
  - Corinna Tsopei
  - Christine Hughes
  - Henny Deul
  - Mary Bai
  - Thelma Ingvarsdóttir
  - Meher Castelino Mistri
  - Maurine Elizabeth Lecky
  - Ronit Rinat
  - Emanuela Stramana
  - Beverly Rerrie
  - Chizuko Matsumoto
  - Mariette Sophie
  - Angela Martha Filmer
  - Lyndal Ursula Cruickshank
  - Edna Park
  - Jorunn Nystedt Barun
  Okinawa - Toyoko Uehara
  - Maritza Montilla
  - Miriam Riart 
  - Miluska Vondrak Steel
  - Maria Myrna Panlilio
  - Yolanda Rodríguez Machin
  - Lana Yu Yi
  - Wendy Barrie
  - Gail Robinson
  - Shin Jung-hyun
  - Maria José Ulloa Madronero
  - Stella Hadley
  - Cynthia Ingrid Dijkstra
  - Siv Märta Aaberg
  - Sandra Sulser
  - Julia Merlene Laurence
  - Claudine Younes
  - Inçi Duran
  - Bobbi Johnson
  - Delia Babiak 
  - Mercedes Revenga
  - Marilyn Joy Samuel

Notes

Debuts

Name changes 
 began competing as Malaysia.

Returns

Last competed in 1952:
 
Last competed in 1954:
 
Last competed in 1958:
 
Last competed in 1960:
 
Last competed in 1961:
 
Last competed in 1962:

Replacements
  - Doreen Swan was replaced by Wendy Barrie. After running away to marry one of the judges. At this point Doreen was underaged so she and (judge) James Alexander Do Watt Nicoll travelled across America followed by the FBI as they believed she had been kidnapped. Then moved across state lines where it was legal to marry at her age and stayed married for many years.

Withdrawals
 
 
  - Sandra Correa

Did not compete
  - Vera Wee (Singapore was a part of Malaysia until separated in October 1965.)

Awards
  - Miss Amity (Jeanne Venables)
  - Miss Photogenic (Emanuela Stramana)
  - Best National Costume (Henny Deul)

General References

References

External links

 Miss Universe official website

1964
1964 in Florida
1964 beauty pageants
Beauty pageants in the United States
Events in Miami Beach, Florida
August 1964 events in the United States